HP filter has several meanings:

 Hodrick-Prescott filter, an economical filter
 High-Pass Filter, a frequency filter